CPC may refer to:

Organizations

Companies
 Canada Post Corporation, the primary postal operator in Canada
 Caspian Pipeline Consortium, consortium and a pipeline to transport Caspian oil to Russia's Black Sea coast
 Consolidated Pastoral Company, an agrifood business in Australia
 Corn Products Company, later CPC International, acquired by Unilever
 CPC (company), British electrical products distribution company
 CPC Corporation, Taiwanese petrochemicals company
Crescent Purchasing Consortium, a central purchasing body operating in the United Kingdom

Education
 California Preparatory College, Redlands, California, U.S.
 Cascade Pacific Council, in Scouting in Oregon, U.S.
 Children's Psychiatric Center, in the High Point Schools, U.S.
 College Preparatory Center, by the Saudi Arabian Oil Company, Saudi Aramco

Politics

Communist parties
 Communist Party of Canada, the longest-standing Canadian communist party
 Communist Party of Canada (Marxist–Leninist), founded by Hardial Bains
 Communist Party of China
 Communist Party of Cuba
 Communist Party of Cyprus, former name of the Progressive Party of Working People

Other parties
 Congress for Progressive Change, a dissolved conservative party in Nigeria
 Congressional Progressive Caucus, group affiliated with the Democratic Party in the US
 Conservative Party of Canada, a conservative party in Canada
 Conservative Party Conference, annual conference of the Conservative Party in the UK

Religion
 Covenant Presbyterian Church, US Presbyterian church denomination
 Cumberland Presbyterian Church, Presbyterian church denomination
 Montenegrin Orthodox Church

Other organizations
 Canadian Parachute Centre, former name of the Canadian Army Advanced Warfare Centre
 Canadian Paralympic Committee, which represents Canadian Paralympic athletes in the International Paralympic Committee and the Parapan American Games
 California Policy Center, a conservative think tank operating in California
 Center for Plant Conservation, a non-profit research organization operating in Canada and the United States
 Charles Perkins Centre, an Australian medical research institute at the University of Sydney
 Climate Prediction Center, a U.S. federal agency that is part of the National Centers for Environmental Prediction
 Coalition of Patriots for Change, coalition of armed groups in the Central African Republic
 Commission for the Prevention of Corruption of the Republic of Slovenia
 Connected Places Catapult, British government agency
 Consumer Protection Committee, Republic of China government agency, Taiwan
 Cost Per Click, internet advertising model used to drive traffic to websites
 Crisis pregnancy center, type of pregnancy counseling center affiliated with anti-abortion movement

Science and technology
 Calcined petroleum coke
 Cape Photographic Catalogue, a star catalogue
 Centrifugal partition chromatography
 Cephalosporin C, an antibiotic
 Cetylpyridinium chloride
 Choroid plexus cyst
 Circuit protective conductor, see earthing system
 Compound parabolic concentrator 
 Condensation particle counter
 Computer Physics Communications
 Chromosomal passenger complex, a protein complex that plays a role in cytokinesis

Computing
 Amstrad CPC, a home computer of the 1980s
 Cartesian Perceptual Compression
 Cost per click, a type of online advertising
 Custom PC, a magazine

Transport
 Clapham Common tube station, London, by London Underground station code
 CP Air, by ICAO code

Other uses
 Central Product Classification, a product classification for goods and services by the United Nations Statistical Commission
 Certificate of Professional Competence, qualifications for the UK transport and haulage industry
 Civil procedure code or Civil procedure
 Community Patent Convention
 Cooperative Patent Classification, a patent classification jointly developed by the European Patent Office and the United States Patent and Trademark Office
 Country of Particular Concern, to the U.S. State Department
 Certified Professional Coder (CPC®), in healthcare administration
 Piano Concerto No. 1 (Chopin) or Piano Concerto No. 2 (Chopin)